Oswald Dair Peraza (born June 15, 2000) is a Venezuelan professional baseball shortstop for the New York Yankees of Major League Baseball (MLB). Peraza signed with the Yankees as an international free agent in 2016. He made his MLB debut in 2022.

Career
Peraza signed with the New York Yankees as an international free agent in July 2016. He made his professional debut in 2017 with the Dominican Summer League Yankees. He was later promoted to the Gulf Coast Yankees that season.

Peraza played the 2018 season with the Pulaski Yankees and 2019 with the Staten Island Yankees and Charleston RiverDogs. He did not play a minor league game in 2020 due to season being cancelled because of the COVID-19 pandemic.

The Yankees added Peraza to their 40-man roster after the 2020 season to protect him from being exposed in the Rule 5 draft. He played the 2021 season with the Hudson Valley Renegades, Somerset Patriots, and Scranton/Wilkes-Barre RailRiders. 

Peraza returned to Scranton/Wilkes-Barre for the 2022 season, batting .259/.329/.448 in 386 at bats.

The Yankees promoted Peraza to the major leagues on September 1, 2022, and in 49 at bats he hit .306/.404/.429, while playing 12 games at shortstop and four games at second base.

References

External links

2000 births
Living people
Cardenales de Lara players
Charleston RiverDogs players
Dominican Summer League Yankees players
Gulf Coast Yankees players
Hudson Valley Renegades players
Major League Baseball players from Venezuela
Major League Baseball shortstops
New York Yankees players
Pulaski Yankees players
Scranton/Wilkes-Barre RailRiders players
Somerset Patriots players
Sportspeople from Barquisimeto
Staten Island Yankees players
Venezuelan expatriate baseball players in the Dominican Republic
Venezuelan expatriate baseball players in the United States